Cudsaskwa Beach is a hamlet in the Canadian province of Saskatchewan.

This community is a resort on Wakaw Lake. The name is a combination of Cudworth (a nearby town), Saskatchewan, and Wakaw Lake.

Demographics 

References

Designated places in Saskatchewan
Hoodoo No. 401, Saskatchewan
Organized hamlets in Saskatchewan
Division No. 15, Saskatchewan